Qelech Khan Kandi (also Romanized as Qelech Khān Kandī; also known as Qelīchkhān Kandī and Qelīch Khān Kandī) is a village in Charuymaq-e Jonubesharqi Rural District, Shadian District, Charuymaq County, East Azerbaijan Province, Iran. At the 2006 census, its population was 483, in 82 families.

References 

Populated places in Charuymaq County